The 1986–87 Full Members' Cup was the second edition of the tournament created to compensate for the ban on English clubs from European football following the Heysel Stadium disaster. It was won by Blackburn Rovers, who beat Charlton Athletic 1–0 in the final at Wembley.

The Following teams opted out of this competition: Liverpool, Tottenham, Arsenal, Luton Town, Nottingham Forest, Manchester United, Queens Park Rangers, Leicester City.

First round

Second round

Third round

Quarter-final

Semi-final

Final

References

External links
 First round
 Second round
 Third round
 Quarter-final
 Semi-final
 Final

Full Members' Cup
1986–87 in English football